Pareeksha – The Final Test is a 2019 Indian Hindi-language drama film directed by Prakash Jha. The film stars Adil Hussain, Priyanka Bose, Sanjay Suri, Shourya Deep and Shubham Jha in the lead roles. The film takes on the education system in India and revolves around the story of an ordinary rickshaw driver in Ranchi, Jharkhand, who aspires and dreams of providing a maximum possible quality education to his son by making arrangements for him to study at a private English medium school.

The film is based on the real-life story of IPS officer Abhayanand, who teaches and coaches kids in a village in Bihar affected by the Naxal to help them pass in the IIT-JEE exams. Initially intended for theatrical release, the film was premiered through ZEE5 on 6 August 2020.

Cast 
 Adil Hussain as Bucchi
 Priyanka Bose as Radhika
 Sanjay Suri as SP Kailash Anand
 Shourya Deep as Gaurav Bhatia
 Shubham Jha as Bulbul

Release 
The film was premiered at the 50th International Film Festival of India in the Indian Panorama section in 2019. In June 2020, the film was scheduled for its premiere screening at the London Indian Film Festival but was postponed due to technical issues.

It was supposed to have its theatrical release but was called off due to the COVID-19 pandemic in India. In June 2020, Zee5 digital platform announced that the film was released on 6 August 2020 via the platform. This also marked Prakash Jha's maiden collaboration with a digital OTT platform.

Reception 
British filmmaker Peter Webber praised the storyline of the film stating that the film resembles something similar to the evergreen 1948 Italian film Bicycle Thieves. Saibal Chatterjee of NDTV rated the film 3.5 out of 5 stars stating that the film was well intentioned and praised the clinical performance of Adil Hussain.

References

External links 
 
 Pareeksha at ZEE5

Drama films based on actual events
2010s Hindi-language films
2019 direct-to-video films
2019 drama films
2019 films
Hindi-language films based on actual events
Indian drama films
Indian films based on actual events
ZEE5 original films
Hindi-language drama films
Films about the education system in India
Films about examinations and testing